Leonid Aleksandrovich Bichevin (Russian: Леони́д Алекса́ндрович Биче́вин; born 24 December 1984) is a Russian film and theater actor.

Early life
Leonid Bichevin was born in Klimovsk, Moscow Oblast, Russian SFSR, Soviet Union (now Russia). In his youth he was engaged in music, and played in a band on the guitar.
In addition, since his childhood he had a horse and he was fond of horse riding.
After the ninth grade of school, he decided to devote himself to breeding and raising rare breeds of horses. For this, he entered the agricultural school in Kolomna.

However, after studying there for a while he became interested in becoming an actor.

Enrolled in the Boris Shchukin Theatre Institute, he graduated in 2006 from the course of Yuri Shlykov. Graduation theatrical performances: "Straw Hat" by E. Labish; "West Side Story" by A. Lorents; "The Theatrical Novel" by M. Bulgakov.

In 2006, right after receiving the diploma, he was admitted to the troupe of the State Academic Theater named after E.B. Vakhtangov.

He collaborated with the Vilnius Theater Angelica Holina and played in the production of "Carmen" J. Bizet (director A. Kholin, the role - Don Jose).

Career
He is best known for his roles in films Cargo 200 and Morphine by Alexei Balabanov. Bichevin has been the member of the Vakhtangov Theatre since 2006, and has participated in plays such as Cyrano de Bergerac, The Dog in the Manger, Troilus and Cressida, Amphitryon and Measure for Measure.

Personal life 
He dated his classmate at the theater institute, actress Agniya Kuznetsova.
On 29 July 2011, Leonid Bichevin married actress Mariya Berdinskikh. They had a son Ivan in September 2014. At the end of 2019 they had a second son Stepan.

Filmography

Theatre roles

Awards and nominations

References

External links 
 

1984 births
Living people
People from Klimovsk
Russian male film actors
Russian male stage actors
Russian male television actors
Male actors from Moscow
21st-century Russian male actors